CSS Baltic was an ironclad warship that served in the Confederate States Navy during the American Civil War. A towboat before the war, she was purchased by the state of Alabama in December 1861 for conversion into an ironclad.  After being transferred to the Confederate Navy in May 1862 as an ironclad, she served on Mobile Bay off the Gulf of Mexico.  Baltics condition in Confederate service was such that naval historian William N. Still Jr. has described her as "a nondescript vessel in many ways".  Over the next two years, parts of the ship's wooden structure were affected by wood rot. Her armor was removed to be put onto the ironclad CSS Nashville in 1864.  By that August, Baltic had been decommissioned. Near the end of the war, she was taken up the Tombigbee River, where she was captured by Union forces on May 10, 1865.  An inspection of Baltic the next month found that her upper hull and deck were rotten and that her boilers were unsafe.  She was sold on December 31, and was likely broken up in 1866.

Background and description
During the early 19th century, a large cultural divide had developed between the northern and southern regions of the United States primarily over slavery, which was mainly a southern institution.  Northerner Abraham Lincoln won the 1860 presidential election, and due to his anti-slavery position a number of southern states seceded in late 1860 and early 1861, forming the Confederate States of America; by April 1861, the American Civil War had commenced. 

From the beginning of the conflict, the Confederates were at a distinct disadvantage compared to the Union Navy due a lack of available ships, infrastructure, and manufacturing capabilities. Control of the Confederate coastline was important because the Union's Anaconda Plan intended to blockade the Confederacy to cut off trade, including imported armaments.  After Union victories at the Battle of Forts Hatteras and Clark and the Battle of Port Royal in late 1861, both the Confederate government and the individual Confederate states became more concerned with coastal defense.

Baltic was built in 1860 at Philadelphia, Pennsylvania.  Little is known about her, and naval historian Saxon Bisbee describes her as "one of the most obscure Confederate ironclads" and states that "Confederate documents relating to the vessel are almost nonexistent".  According to Bisbee, the vessel was taken to Mobile, Alabama, after her construction by Bragdon, but the Dictionary of American Naval Fighting Ships (DANFS) says that she was built for the Southern Steamship Company.  She was used as a towboat and as a cotton lighter in Mobile Bay off the Gulf of Mexico.

On November 8, 1861, the Alabama General Assembly passed legislation appropriating $150,000 for an ironclad that could serve as both a gunboat and as a ram. The state government formed a commission to select a vessel for conversion, and the sidewheel steamer Baltic was bought on December 13 at a cost of $40,000. To allow her hull to carry the extra weight of the armor and guns, the ship was fitted with hog chains.

As was normal for steamboats of the time, the vessel could be powered by burning either wood or coal. Most Confederate ironclads were screw steamers instead of paddle steamers; Baltic was one of the few paddle steamer ironclads actually completed or converted within the Confederacy, and naval historian Raimondo Luraghi described her propulsion as obsolescent. She also had difficulty steering. She had a crew of 86, whose quarters Luraghi describes as "very poor". Confederate ironclads frequently had issues with excessive heat below deck, the emission of noxious fumes from the machinery, and poor ventilation; Baltics crew frequently slept on dry land or in the open air.

Her bow was strengthened so that it could serve as a ram, and she was armed with six cannons: two Dahlgren guns, two 32-pounder guns, and two other pieces that Luraghi refers to as "minor" and the DANFS as "smaller". Historian Gary D. Joiner notes that the Dahlgrens were likely  pieces. Naval historian Donald Canney says that her armament consisted of two Dahlgrens and three 32-pounders or possibly a pair of Dahlgrens plus one 42-pounder and two 32-pounders. The layout of the vessel is largely unknown. Few descriptions of Baltic post-conversion exist, and Still describes the completed product as "a nondescript vessel in many ways".

Service history

On May 12, 1862, Baltic was transferred by the State of Alabama to the Confederate States Navy.  The Confederates placed her under the command of Lieutenant James D. Johnston.  The vessel was formally commissioned that month.  She served on Mobile Bay, the area around Mobile, Alabama, and on the Tombigbee River.  By February 1863, the ship was too dilapidated for active service, and she was relegated to placing naval mines to protect Mobile Bay.  Prior to CSS Tennessees completion in February 1864, Baltic was the only Confederate ironclad on Mobile Bay.  Once Tennessee was completed, Johnston was transferred to command her, and Lieutenant Charles Carroll Simms was appointed to command Baltic. Through late 1863 and early 1864, Baltics condition worsened.  By March 20, 1864, naval constructor John L. Porter had surveyed the ship's condition, judging it to be in such poor condition that he recommended that the iron be removed from her.  On May 20, Simms wrote that Baltic was very rotten and was "about as fit to go into action as a mud scow".

In July, the vessel was partially dismantled, and some of her armor was removed and placed onto the ironclad CSS Nashville.  After her armor was removed, Confederate naval officer John Randolph Tucker noted that engineers had declared her boilers to be unsafe and that they were having to be patched.  On July 21, Simms was appointed to command Nashville, and the rest of Baltics armor was removed to be put on Nashville. By the time of the Battle of Mobile Bay in early August, Baltic had been decommissioned.  With the end of the war approaching, Baltic, Nashville, and other vessels were sent up the Tombigbee River.  They were captured by Union forces on May 10, 1865, at Nanna Hubba Bluff.  The next month, Union authorities surveyed Baltic and noted that below the load line she was in good condition, but that the portion of her hull above the load line and the deck were both rotten.  Although the engines were in good condition at that time, the boilers were unsafe to use.  The surveyors suggested that with repairs, Baltic could return to use as a towboat, but this never happened, and she was sold on December 31.  Bisbee believes that Baltic was probably broken up at some point in 1866 and suggests that the ship's known poor condition and the lack of further records relating to her indicate that she was likely not used for any other purposes.

Notes

References

Sources

Further reading
 

Ironclad warships of the Confederate States Navy
Alabama in the American Civil War
Ships built in Philadelphia
1860 ships